Mavilus, distinguished as Mavilus of Hadrumetum, was an early Christian martyr during the persecutions of Caracalla. He suffered martyrdom at Hadrumetum, in 212, by being thrown to wild beasts, by order of Governor Scapula.

His feast day is 4 January.

References

212 deaths
Saints from Roman Africa (province)
3rd-century Christian martyrs
Year of birth unknown